Colliston railway station  was a railway station at Colliston near Arbroath in Scotland.

The station was opened on 24 November 1838 by the Arbroath and Forfar Railway. The station was closed to passengers on 5 December 1955.

References

External links

Disused railway stations in Angus, Scotland
Former Caledonian Railway stations
Railway stations in Great Britain opened in 1838
Railway stations in Great Britain closed in 1955
1838 establishments in the United Kingdom
1838 establishments in Scotland
1955 disestablishments in Scotland